Hedda Østberg Amundsen (born 18 September 1998) is a Norwegian cross-country skier.

At the 2018 Junior World Championships she recorded an 11th place, a ninth place as well as a seventh place in the relay. She made her World Cup debut in December 2018 at Beitostølen and collected her first World Cup points with an 18th place at the 2019 Holmenkollen ski festival.

She represents the sports club Asker SK. She is a twin sister of Harald Østberg Amundsen.

Cross-country skiing results
All results are sourced from the International Ski Federation (FIS).

World Cup

Season standings

References 

1998 births
Living people
People from Asker
Norwegian female cross-country skiers
Twin sportspeople
Norwegian twins
Sportspeople from Viken (county)